Petra Dallmann (born 21 November 1978 in Freiburg im Breisgau) is a German swimmer. She won a bronze medal in 2004 Olympics. She has also won many other medals, including a gold medal in 2001 World Aquatics Championships.

See also
List of World Aquatics Championships medalists in swimming (women)#4 .C3.97 100 metre freestyle

References

External links 
  

German female swimmers
Olympic swimmers of Germany
Swimmers at the 2004 Summer Olympics
Swimmers at the 2008 Summer Olympics
Olympic bronze medalists for Germany
1978 births
Living people
World record setters in swimming
Olympic bronze medalists in swimming
German female freestyle swimmers
World Aquatics Championships medalists in swimming
Sportspeople from Freiburg im Breisgau
European Aquatics Championships medalists in swimming
Medalists at the 2004 Summer Olympics
Universiade medalists in swimming
Universiade gold medalists for Germany
Medalists at the 2001 Summer Universiade
Medalists at the 2003 Summer Universiade
Medalists at the 2005 Summer Universiade
20th-century German women
21st-century German women